The Central District of Nahavand County is a district (bakhsh) in Nahavand County, Hamadan Province, Iran. At the 2006 census, its population was 116,092, in 30,864 families.  The District has one city: Nahavand.  The District has three rural districts (dehestan): Gamasiyab Rural District, Shaban Rural District, and Tariq ol Eslam Rural District.

References 

Nahavand County
Districts of Hamadan Province